Castel di Lucio (Sicilian: Castiddruzzu) is a comune (municipality) in the Province of Messina in the Italian region Sicily, located about  southeast of Palermo and about  southwest of Messina. Castel di Lucio borders the following municipalities: Geraci Siculo, Mistretta, Nicosia, Pettineo, San Mauro Castelverde.

History 
Castel di Lucio was populated in the Norman period by families from continental Italy and southern France. The presence of Gallo-Italic dialects may suggest a Ligurian colonization, and a foundation or re-foundation by the Ligurian Ventimiglia. From 1480 to 1634 there were many lords of Castel di Lucio: Matteo Speciale, Nicola Siracusa, the Lercano, the Ansalone, the Timpanaro, the Cannizzaro, and the Agraz. In 1726 Francesco Agraz was named first Duke of Castelluzzo in a diploma of Charles IV of Sicily, thus closing the baronial era. In the 16th century there were 1617 inhabitants in 346 houses, in the seventeenth century the population increase was slight, to 1695 inhabitants and 528 houses. There were no significant changes in the eighteenth century.

References

Cities and towns in Sicily